Thomas A. Gardiner (August 2, 1832 New York City – May 2, 1881 Brooklyn, Kings County, New York) was an American politician from New York.

Life
He was the son of George W. Gardiner (d. 1852), an Irish-born merchant. The family removed to Brooklyn in 1840.

As a Democrat, he was a member of the New York State Assembly (Kings Co., 4th D.) in 1859; a member of the New York State Senate (2nd D.) in 1860 and 1861; and Treasurer of Kings County from 1863 to 1880.

He died at his residence, at 49 Portland Ave., Brooklyn, of pulmonary hemorrhage.

Sources
 The New York Civil List compiled by Franklin Benjamin Hough, Stephen C. Hutchins and Edgar Albert Werner (1867; pg. 442 and 488)
 Biographical Sketches of the State Officers and Members of the Legislature of the State of New York by William D. Murphy (1861; pg. 54ff)
 CITY AND SUBURBAN NEWS; BROOKLYN; Ex-County Treasurer Thomas A. Gardiner died... in NYT on May 3, 1881

1832 births
1881 deaths
Democratic Party New York (state) state senators
Politicians from Brooklyn
Democratic Party members of the New York State Assembly
Deaths from pulmonary hemorrhage
19th-century American politicians